Jeannie Haddaway-Riccio (born April 30, 1977) is a politician from Maryland who served as Secretary of the Maryland Department of Natural Resources. She previously served as the deputy chief of staff to Maryland Governor Larry Hogan (2016–2019); as director of intergovernmental affairs for Hogan (2015–2016); and as a member of the Maryland House of Delegates, from District 37B (2003–2015).

Background
Jeannie Haddaway was born in Easton, Maryland, but grew up in Neavitt. She was first appointed to office in 2003 by Governor Bob Ehrlich to replace Kenneth D. Schisler who was appointed as the chair of the Maryland Public Service Commission. At the time, Haddaway was the youngest member of the Maryland House of Delegates.  District 37B covers parts of Caroline, Dorchester, Talbot, & Wicomico counties.  In 2006, she ran for her first election and, along with Adelaide Eckardt, handily defeated her Democratic challengers. Delegate Haddaway is a member of the Easton Church of God, where she served as a Sunday school teacher. She is married and resides in a Talbot County.

Education
Haddaway graduated from St. Michaels High School in St. Michael's, MD.  After high school, she attended Salisbury University and graduated in 1999 with a degree in  Political Science and a minor in art/graphic design.

Career

After college, she took a position as an administrative assistant for the Maryland Department of the Environment and eventually obtained a position as a public affairs specialist. She worked at MDE until 2000.

In 2001, she became a Development Officer for the Maryland-DC Office of the National Audubon Society and worked there until 2003.  While working for the National Audubon Society, she started her own company, Dragonfly Designs, LLC., which is a graphic and web-design company.

Haddaway took a big step in her political career in 2002 when she became a member of the Talbot County Republican Central Committee and has served as vice-chair. She is also a member of the Mid-Shore League of Republican Women, and the Republicans for Environmental Protection. She is the founder and past president of Mid-Shore Young Republicans, a founding member of Delmarva Planned Giving Council, a member of the Talbot County Chamber of Commerce, the Talbot County Young Professionals, the Leave A Legacy Delmarva, and the Rotaract of Easton.

As a member of the Maryland House of Delegates, she serves as the Minority Whip. She is on the Economic Matters Committee and various sub-committees.  She is an Executive Board Member of the Legislative Policy Committee for the Women's Caucus. She is the Treasurer of the Eastern Shore Delegation and is the Chair of the Talbot County Delegation.

Haddaway was appointed to the Federal Relations Committee, Task Force on Renewable Fuels, the Rural Maryland Council and the Electric Universal Service Program Workgroup. She was also President Elect, Women's Caucus and Chair, Talbot County Delegation.

She was a candidate for Lt. Governor in Maryland.

2014 gubernatorial election
On July 7, 2013, Republican David R. Craig has Del. Jeannie Haddaway-Riccio as his running mate in his bid to be the governor of Maryland in 2014. Haddaway, native of Eastern Shore of Maryland, said she has spent almost a decade as an Eastern Shore lawmaker.

Election results
2006 Race for Maryland House of Delegates – District 37B
Voters to choose two:
{| class="wikitable"
!Name
!Votes
!Percent
!Outcome
|-
|-
|Adelaide C. Eckardt, Rep.
|19,980
|  34.5%
|   Won
|-
|-
|Jeannie Haddaway, Rep.
|18,677
|  32.2%
|   Won
|-
|-
|James A. Adkins, Dem.
|9,640
|  16.6%
|   Lost
|-
|-
|Tim Quinn, Dem.
|9,588
|  16.6%
|   Lost
|-
|Other Write-Ins
|34
|  0.1%
|   Lost
|}

References and notes

External links
 

State cabinet secretaries of Maryland
Republican Party members of the Maryland House of Delegates
People from Easton, Maryland
1977 births
Living people
Women state legislators in Maryland
Salisbury University alumni
People from Talbot County, Maryland
21st-century American politicians
21st-century American women politicians